List of Danish football transfers 2008–09 may refer to:
List of Danish football transfers summer 2008
List of Danish football transfers winter 2008–09
List of Danish football transfers summer 2009

Football transfers summer 2008
Football transfers summer 2009
Football transfers winter 2008–09